Sheikh Yousef   is a Syrian village located in Armanaz Nahiyah in Harem District, Idlib.  According to the Syria Central Bureau of Statistics (CBS), Sheikh Yousef had a population of 2831 in the 2004 census.

References 

Populated places in Harem District